Hosea Taylor (born December 3, 1958) is a former American football defensive end for the Baltimore Colts of the National Football League (NFL). He played 16 games in the 1981 NFL season and four games in the 1983 NFL season. Taylor played college football at the University of Houston and was a 1979 All-America and 1980 All-America selection.

Taylor graduated from Longview High School in Longview, Texas in the late 1970s.  His nephew, Curtis Brown, is a former cornerback for the Pittsburgh Steelers of the National Football League.

Taylor is currently working  as an assembler at Capacity of  Texas for the last 10 years and lives in Longview, TX.

References

1958 births
Living people
People from Jefferson, Texas
People from Longview, Texas
Players of American football from Texas
American football defensive ends
Houston Cougars football players
Baltimore Colts players